Blessings and Miracles is the twenty-sixth studio album by American rock band Santana. The album was released on October 15, 2021, by Starfaith LLC and BMG Rights Management and produced by Carlos Santana himself, who prepared it over the course of two years.

The album features a number of guests, including Chris Stapleton, Ally Brooke, Corey Glover, Kirk Hammett, Chick Corea, Gayle Moran Corea, Steve Winwood and Rob Thomas, with whom Santana recorded again over 20 years after their hit "Smooth". Many of the collaborations were recorded remotely.

In July 2021, he announced his signing with BMG Rights Management to release the album.

Concept 
When asked about the reason behind the change of style from Africa Speaks to Blessings and Miracles, Santana said it was "intuition" which told him to "get back on the radio in the four corners of the world and touch people's hearts. Because of this [pandemic], people need hope and courage. [...] Blessings and Miracles is a divine attempt to help people have a deep sense of self-worth. There are a lot of people out there who have very low self-esteem."

He held a think tank meeting at his office and asked for names that could help him in his objective to get back on the radio.

According to Santana, the title of the album comes from "my belief that we're born with heavenly powers that allows us to create blessings and miracles". He believes music has such power. He also saw the album as "mystical medicine music to heal an infected world of fear and darkness." The cover art features an image of Tlāloc, the Aztec god of rain.

Song information 
"Joy", featuring Chris Stapleton, was inspired by Bob Marley's and John Lennon's ideals of union and was defined by Santana as "the ultimate medicine and remedy against fear."

The album features a cover of Procol Harum's "A Whiter Shade of Pale". According to Santana, he was in Hyde Park performing with Eric Clapton and, while Gary Clark Jr. was playing, he told Steve Winwood "I hear you singing 'A Whiter Shade of Pale' and playing the organ and me playing guitar, and doing it completely differently — more like an African, Cuban, Puerto Rican guajira style. Very sexy." With the help of Narada Michael Walden, the collaboration was arranged.

Santana originally invited Aerosmith's Steven Tyler to sing on "America for Sale", but he wasn't available, so he asked the other guest of the song (Metallica's Kirk Hammett) for a suggestion and he came up with his friend Mark Osegueda from Death Angel.

Blessings and Miracles features two songs written by Santana's children: "Breathing Underwater", by Stella, and "Rumbalero", by Salvador. When he heard the latter for the first time, he had to Shazam it to find out it was his own son's music. He requested permission from both to record their songs on his then upcoming album and both thought he was kidding at first.

"Yo Estaré", the Spanish version of the song "Break" featuring Ally Brooke, was released as a single on April 15, 2022, having previously only been released on the vinyl version of the album.

Critical reception

Kronen Zeitung felt that the album "only partially succeeds in terms of the quality of the 15 songs" and that it didn't "come close" to 1999's Supernatural. He thought some aspects of the album were "calculated", such as the guests.

The French edition of Rolling Stone felt that the album could be "a little too mainstream for those who dream of a 'real' return to the roots" and that Blessing and Miracles "perhaps does not carry in it the hoped-for miracles". They praised songs like "Santana Celebration" and "Peace Power" and rated the album 3.5/5.

In a review for Metal.de, Christian Flack said the album proves that Santana's "creativity and musical genius are far from exhausted" and felt it was "fresh and charismatic". He didn't see any weak moments and ultimately called it "a strong, musically broad-based [...] and highly ambitious album with a star cast and outstanding guitar solos."

Writing for Laut.de, Philipp Kause saw the album as a sort of a "sampler" due to the many guests and genres and congratulated it for containing "something for everyone". He also felt that the album "seems much more suitable for everyday use, less cerebral, no longer tailored to a jazz / exoticism elite" and that "snippets of film from the Woodstock concert document will appear in your mind's eye while listening to it". On the other hand, he felt that the album failed at harmonizing "the beautiful charm of such sentimental songs like 'Whiter Shade of Pale' with crowbar production".

Michael Galluci felt the album is "all over the place, but not without occasional highlights". He thought the album constantly shifts from songs reminiscent of their earliest years to music similar to Abraxas and Shamans. He also thought Santana wasn't as overshadowed by the guests as he was in his successful 1990s/2000s albums. He finished his review by calling it "a more genuine representation of Santana's music as they roll into another decade."

AllMusic's Stephen Thomas Erlewine saw the album's spirit as "formulaic" rather than "fresh" as it was in 1999 (when Supernatural was released). He felt the guest vocalists were genuinely enthusiastic about their songs and conceded that "awkward fusions" such as G-Eazy's and Diane Warren's feats "make Blessings and Miracles seem like an album created by artists and not in a corporate boardroom". He ultimately said "that these diverse strands don't quite get threaded together is OK: as a collection of moments, Blessings and Miracles does the job."

Track listing

Personnel 
 Carlos Santana : Lead and Rhythm Guitar, Percussion 
 Kirk Hammett : Lead Guitar
 Tommy Anthony : Rhythm Guitar, Lead Vocals 
 Ish Cano : Additionnal Guitar, Programming
 Benny Rietveld : Bass Guitar 
 J.T. Cure : Bass Guitar
 Tammy Rogers : Violin, Octave Violin
 Narada Michael Walden : Keyboards, Bass & Drum Programming
 Chick Corea : Keyboards, Fender Rhodes Electric Piano
 David K. Mathews : Keyboards, Hammond B3 Organ
 Salvador Santana : Keyboards, Synthesizers 
 Peter Stengaard : Additionnal Keyboards, Programming, Drums, Bass, Additional Guitar
 Justus Dobrin : Additionnal Keyboards
 Asdru Sierra : Synthesizers, Drum Programming, Lead Vocals
 Gayle Moran Corea : Lead Vocals, Angel Choir 
 Steve Winwood : Lead Vocals 
 Stella Santana : Lead Vocals
 Rob Thomas : Lead Vocals
 Chris Stapleton : Lead Vocals, Backing Vocals, Guitar
 Andy Vargas : Lead Vocals
 Ally Brooke : Lead Vocals
 Mark Osegueda : Lead Vocals
 G-Eazy : Lead Vocals
 Corey Glover : Lead Vocals
 Gerald Gillum : Rap
 Andy Snitzer : Tenor Saxophone, Baritone Saxophone, Horn Arrangement
 Michael Davis : Trombone
 Raúl Agraz : Trumpet
 Tony Kadleck : Trumpet
 Cindy Blackman Santana : Drums
 Derek Mixon : Drums
 Karl Perazzo : Timbales, Congas, Percussion, Vocals
 Matt Sanchez : Percussion, Programming, Backing Vocals
 Cindy Mizelle, Dave Rublin, Erica Hansen, Jerry Barnes, Jessie Wagner, Katie Sanchez, Lisa Fischer, Zac Barnett : Backing Vocals

Charts

References

 Personnel : https://www.discogs.com/fr/release/20953015-Santana-Blessings-And-Miracles

2021 albums
Santana (band) albums
BMG Rights Management albums